Karol Kučera was the defending champion but did not compete that year.

Thomas Enqvist won in the final 6–2, 4–6, 7–6(7–4), 1–6, 6–1 against Roger Federer.

Seeds
A champion seed is indicated in bold text while text in italics indicates the round in which that seed was eliminated.

Draw

Finals

Top half

Bottom half

External links
Draw

2000 ATP Tour
2000 Davidoff Swiss Indoors